Al-Sheikh or Al-Shaykh is an Arabic surname. Notable people with the surname include:

Abdullah bin Muhammad Al Sheikh
Abdulaziz Al Sheikh
Ali Jawad al-Sheikh
Ali Mahmud al-Shaykh
Faiq Al Sheikh Ali
Hamad bin Mohammed Al Al-Sheikh
Hanan al-Shaykh
Hashim al-Sheikh
Hassouneh Al-Sheikh
Hussain Al-Sheikh
Hussein al-Sheikh (politician)
Jahad Abdullah Al-Sheikh
Mohammed al-Shaykh
Mustafa Al-Sheikh
Radwan Al-Sheikh Hassan
Saleh Al Sheikh
Salman Hamad Al-Sheikh
Shawqi al-Shaykh
Suleiman bin Abdullah Al Sheikh
Tarfa bint Abdullah Al Sheikh
 Umar al Shaykh
Zahid Al-Sheikh

See also

Ibn al-Sheikh

Arabic-language surnames